Jaune Quick-to-See Smith (born 1940) is a Native American visual artist and curator. She is an enrolled member of the Confederated Salish and Kootenai Tribes and is also of Métis and Shoshone descent. She is also an art educator, art advocate, and political activist. She has been prolific in her long career, and her work draws from a Native worldview and comments on American Indian identity, histories of oppression, and environmental issues.

In the mid-1970s, Smith gained prominence as a painter and printmaker,[2][3] and later she advanced her style and technique with collage, drawing, and mixed media. Her works have been widely exhibited and many are in the permanent collections of prominent art museums including the Museum of Modern Art, the Whitney Museum of American Art,[11] the Metropolitan Museum of Art, Denver Art Museum, and the Walker Art Center as well as the Smithsonian American Art Museum[12] and National Museum of Women in the Arts.[13] Her work has also been collected by New Mexico Museum of Art (Santa Fe)[14] and Albuquerque Museum,[15] both located in a landscape that has continually served as one of her greatest sources of inspiration. In 2020 the National Gallery of Art announced it had bought her painting I See Red: Target (1992), which thus became the first painting on canvas by a Native American artist in the gallery.

Smith actively supports the Native arts community by organizing exhibitions and project collaborations, and she has also participated in national commissions for public works. She lives in Corrales, New Mexico, near the Rio Grande, with her family.

Biography

Early life
Jaune Quick-to-See Smith was born on January 15, 1940, in St. Ignatius Mission,[1] a small town on the Flathead Reservation on the Confederated Salish and Kootenai Indian Reservation, Montana. Her first name, Jaune, means "yellow" in French, pointing to her French-Cree ancestry. Her Indian name, "Quick-to-See," was given to her by her Shoshone grandmother as a sign of an ability to grasp things readily.[1]

As a child, Smith had an itinerant life. Her father, a single parent who traded horses and participated in rodeos, frequently moved between several reservations as a horse trader. As a result, Jaune lived in various places of the Pacific Northwest and California.[4] Growing up in poverty,[5] Smith worked alongside migrant workers in a Seattle farming community between the ages of eight and fifteen years old, when school was not in session.

However, Smith knew very early on that she wanted to be an artist. She remembers drawing on the ground with sticks as a four-year old,[4] and in first grade, she recalls the first time she encountered tempera paints and crayons:I loved the smell of them. It was a real awakening. I made a painting of children dancing around Mount Rainier. My teacher raved about it. Then with Valentine’s Day approaching, I painted red hearts all over the sky. … I see it as my first abstract painting."

Education
In 1960, Smith began her formal art education in Washington State, earning an associate of arts degree from Olympic College in Bremerton and taking classes at the University of Washington in Seattle. Her education, however, was interrupted because she had to support herself through various jobs as a waitress, Head Start teacher, factory worker, domestic, librarian, janitor, veterinary assistant, and secretary.[4] In 1976, she completed a bachelor's degree in Art Education from Framingham State College, Massachusetts, and then moved to Albuquerque, New Mexico, to start graduate school at the University of New Mexico (UNM). Her initial attraction to the university was its comprehensive Native American studies program, but after applying three times and being successively turned down, she decided to continue taking classes and making art. After an eventual exhibition at the Kornblee Gallery in New York City and its review in Art in America, she was finally accepted into the Department of Fine Arts at UNM where in 1980 she graduated with a Masters in Art.[6] This liberal arts education formally introduced her to studies on the classical and contemporary arts, focusing on European and American artistic practices throughout the millennia, which served as her most influential point of access to the contemporary global art world.[9]

From this background of her childhood and formal arts education, Smith has actively negotiated Native and non-Native societies by navigating, merging, and being inspired by diverse cultures. She produces art that "follows the journey of [her] life as [she moves] through public art projects, collaborations, printmaking, traveling, curating, lecturing and tribal activities." This work serves as a mode of visual communication, which she creatively and consciously composes in layers to bridge gaps between these two worlds[5] and to educate about social, political and environmental issues existing deeper than the surface.

Artistic style
Smith has been creating complicated abstract paintings and lithographs since the 1970s. She employs a wide variety of media, working in painting, printmaking and richly textured mixed media pieces. Such images and collage elements as commercial slogans, sign-like petroglyphs, rough drawing, and the inclusion and layering of text are unusually intersected into a complex vision created out of the artist's personal experience. Her works contain strong, insistent socio-political commentary that speaks to past and present cultural appropriation and abuse, while identifying the continued significance of the Native American peoples. She addresses today's tribal politics, human rights and environmental issues with humor. Smith is known internationally for her philosophically centered work regarding her strong cultural beliefs and political activism.

Smith's collaborative public artworks include the terrazzo floor design in the Great Hall of the Denver Airport; an in-situ sculpture piece in Yerba Buena Gardens, San Francisco; and a mile-long sidewalk history trail in West Seattle.

1980s

Smith's initial mature work consisted of abstract landscapes, begun in the 1970s and carried into the 1980s. Her landscapes often included pictographic symbolism and was considered a form of self-portraiture; Gregory Galligan explains in Arts Magazine in 1986, "each of these works distills decades of personal memory, collective consciousness, and historical awareness into a cogent pictorial synthesis." The landscapes often make use of representations of horses, teepees, humans, antelopes, etc.

These paintings touch on the alienation of the American Indian in modern culture, by acting as a sum of the past and something new altogether. She does this by beginning to saturate her work with the style of Abstract Expressionists. Smith explains, "I look at line, form, color, texture, etc., in contemporary art as well as viewing old Indian artifacts the same way. With this I make parallels from the old world to contemporary art. A Hunkpapa drum become a Rothko painting; ledger-book symbols become Cy Twombly; a Naskaspi bag is Paul Klee; a Blackfoot robe, Agnes Martin; beadwork color is Josef Albers; a parfleche is Frank Stella; design is Vasarely's positive and negative space."

1990s

In the 1990s, Smith began her I See Red series, which she has continued on and off through this day. Paintings in this series were initially exhibited at Bernice Steinbaum Gallery in 1992, in conjunction with protests regarding the Columbian quincentenary. As Erin Valentino describes in Third Text in 1997, "The paintings in this series employ numerous kinds of imagery from an abundance of sources and in a variety of associations: high, mass, consumer, popular, national, mainstream and vernacular cultures, avant-garde (modernist) imagery and so-called Indian imagery in the form of found objects, photographs, scientific illustrations, fabric swatches, bumper stickers, maps, cartoon imagery, advertisements, newspaper cut-outs and visual quotations of her own work, to name some." Here, she juxtaposes stereotypical commodification of native American cultures with visual reminders of their colonizer's legacies. The style of these paintings, with their collage, layered, and misty environments, are reminiscent of that of Robert Rauschenberg and Jasper Johns, their subject matter reminiscent of Andy Warhol, too.

2000s

Smith has consistently addressed respect for nature, animals, and human kind. Her interest in these topics lies in her exploration of the adverse socio-cultural circumstances created for Native Americans by the government; this umbrella term refers to the health, sovereignty, and rights of Native Americans. She is able to put her studies into practice by avoiding toxic art supplies and minimizing excessive art storage space.

Today, Smith's paintings still contain contemporary cultural signifiers and collaged elements. References to the Lone Ranger, Tonto, Snow White, Altoids, Krispy Kreme, Fritos, etc., all serve to critique the rampant consumerism of American culture, and how this culture benefits off of the exploitation of Native American cultures. She uses humor in a cartoonish way to bemoan the corruption of nature and mock the shallowness of contemporary culture.

War is Heck (2002) 
Jaune Quick-to-See Smith creates a unique art piece called, War is Heck (2002). Smith uses her gift to strongly address how her people were treated in the past. “War is Heck” is a lithograph that details the cross-cultural experiences of Smith. Smith adds details such as Native American, European, and American art. Smith uses a “horse” to represent herself, and by doing so she’s attaching herself to her artwork. Smith refers to the Americans by using the American Flag and she uses the “Buffalo” to represent the Native Americans  who lived here first before anyone.  She also includes “El Soldado'' which translates as “the soldier.” She depicts a soldier with wings that appears to be riding the horse. At first glance the red and blue seem to represent the United States of America, but when you take a closer look at the top of the page under the blue it states, “peace.” The display of red could be a representation of all the lives that were lost. This painting has many attributes regarding the people who once roam the land and the people who came to take the land.

Nomad Art Manifesto
As an active environmentalist, Smith often critiques the pollution created through art-making such as toxic materials, excessive storage space, and extensive shipping. The Nomad Art Manifesto, designed based on the aesthetic of parfleches, consists of squares carrying messages about the environment and Indian life, made entirely from biodegradable materials.

The Nomad Art Manifesto:
 Nomad Art is made with biodegradable materials
 Nomad Art can be recycled
 Nomad Art can be folded and sent as a small parcel
 Nomad Art can be stored on a bookshelf, which saves space
 Nomad Art does not need to be framed
 Nomad Art is convenient for countries which may be disbanding or reforming
 Nomad Art is for the new diaspora age.

Awards and honors 
Smith has received attention for her work as an artist, educator, art advocate, and political activist throughout her career and she has received multiple honors, awards and fellowships.

Smith has been awarded several honorary degrees. These include doctorates in art granted by the Minneapolis College of Art and Design in 1992, the Pennsylvania Academy of the Fine Arts in 1998, Massachusetts College of Art in 2003, and University of New Mexico in 2008;[7] a professorship in art by Washington University in St. Louis in 1989; and, a degree in Native American Studies by Salish Kootanai College, Pablo, Montana in 2015.[8]

Among lifetime achievement awards acknowledging dedication to her career, she has received the Women's Caucus for Art Award in the Visual Arts in 1997, the College Art Association Committee on Women in the Arts Award in 2002, and the Woodson Foundation Award in 2014 as well as being inducted into the National Academy of Design in 2011. She has also been the recipient of the Women's Vision Award for the National Women's History Project in Women's Art in 2008 and the Visionary Woman Award from Moore College of Art & Design in 2011. Other notable awards throughout the years have been the Wallace Stegner Award for art of the American West in 1995, the Joan Mitchell Foundation Award in 1996 to archive her work through the Painters Grant, the Eiteljorg Museum  Fellowship for Native American Fine Art in its inaugural year of 1999, ArtTable award in 2011, the Switzer Distinguished Artist Award in 2012, and a United States Artists fellowship in 2020.

Her adoptive state of New Mexico has also lauded her contribution to the arts and local community with praise and continuous recognition over the decades. This began early in her state residency (with her first career honor) when she was named one of "80 Professional Women to Watch in the 1980s" by New Mexico Women's Political Caucus for her local civic engagement in 1979. Subsequent esteemed credits of distinction are: SITE Santa Fe fellowship award in 1995; the New Mexico Governor's Outstanding New Mexico Woman's Award and the New Mexico Governor’s Award for Excellence in the Arts (Allan Houser Memorial Award) both in 2005; the Living Artist of Distinction award by the Georgia O'Keeffe Museum in 2012;[26] the aforementioned doctorate from University of New Mexico (Albuquerque) and the Woodson Foundation award in Santa Fe. Smith was also admitted to the New Mexico Women's Hall of Fame in 2014.

Exhibitions 
Smith has participated in a large number of solo shows in the United States and internationally. Her solo shows include Jaune Quick-to-See Smith (1979), Kornblee Gallery, New York; Parameters Series (1993), Chrysler Museum of Art, Norfolk, Virginia; Jaune Quick-to-See Smith: Poet in Paint (2001), Neuberger Museum of Art, Purchase, New York; Jaune Quick-to-See Smith: Made in America (2003-2009), originating at Belger Arts Center, Kansas City, Missouri; and Jaune Quick-to-See Smith: In the Footsteps of My Ancestors (2017-2019), originating at Yellowstone Art Museum, Billings, Montana.

She has also participated in a large array of group exhibitions, including the 48th Venice Biennale (1999) and the Havana Biennial (2009).

In 2023, Smith was announced as the curator of an exhibition of contemporary art by Native American artists at the National Gallery of Art in Washington, D.C. Smith is the first artist to curate an exhibition at the National Gallery.

Notable works in public collections

Nirada #16 (1982), Fine Arts Museums of San Francisco
The Courthouse Steps (1986), Albuquerque Museum, New Mexico
August Encampment (1989-1999), Metropolitan Museum of Art, New York
Salish Spring (Montana Memories Series) (1988-1989), Missoula Art Museum, Montana
Tamarack (1989), Birmingham Museum of Art, Alabama
Sources of Strength (1990), Minneapolis Institute of Art
I See Red: Herd (1992), Detroit Institute of Arts
I See Red: Salmon Recovery? (1992), Fralin Museum of Art, Charlottesville, Virginia
I See Red: Target (1992), National Gallery of Art, Washington, D.C.
Mischief, Indian Land Series (1992), Crystal Bridges Museum of American Art, Bentonville, Arkansas
The Red Mean: Self Portrait (1992), Smith College Museum of Art, Northampton, Massachusetts
Trade (Gifts for Trading Land with White People) (1992), Chrysler Museum of Art, Norfolk, Virginia
Fish For a Lifetime (1993-1994), Museum of Modern Art, New York
The Vanishing American (1994), Whitney Museum, New York
Genesis (1995), High Museum of Art, Atlanta
I See Red: Migration (1995), Saint Louis Art Museum
All American (1996), Chazen Museum of Art, Madison, Wisconsin
I See Red: Flathead Vest (1996), Colby College Museum of Art, Waterville, Maine
Survival (1996), Cleveland Museum of Art
Famous Names (1998), Memorial Art Gallery, Rochester, New York
Target: The Wild West (1999), Autry Museum of the American West, Los Angeles
Browning of America (Map) (2000), Crocker Art Museum, Sacramento, California
Echo Map I (2000), Baltimore Museum of Art
State Names (2000), Smithsonian American Art Museum, Smithsonian Institution, Washington, D.C.
Tribal Map (2000), Museum of Fine Arts, Boston
Tribal Map (2000-2001), Walter E. Washington Convention Center, Events DC, Washington, D.C.
The Rancher (2002), Hood Museum of Art, Hanover, New Hampshire
Song and Dance (2003), Missoula Art Museum, Montana
What is an American? (2003), Detroit Institute of Arts; Minneapolis Institute of Art; Spencer Museum of Art, Lawrence, Kansas; and Victoria and Albert Museum, London
Trade Canoe for Don Quixote (2004), Denver Art Museum
Who Leads? Who Follows? (2004), Albuquerque Museum, New Mexico
Trade Canoe: Adrift (2015), National Museum of the American Indian, Smithsonian institution, Washington, D.C.
Adios Map (2021), National Gallery of Art, Washington, D.C.

Personal
Smith's son, Neal Ambrose-Smith, is a contemporary painter, printmaker, sculptor and educator.

References

Further reading 
 Kastner, Carolyn. (2013) Jaune Quick-To-See Smith : An American Modernist. Albuquerque, NM: University of New Mexico Press.

External links
Official site

1940 births
20th-century American painters
20th-century American printmakers
20th-century American women artists
American women painters
American women printmakers
Artists from Montana
American contemporary painters
Confederated Salish and Kootenai Tribes
Interior Salish people
Living people
Native American painters
Native American printmakers
Native American women artists
University of New Mexico alumni
People from Corrales, New Mexico
21st-century American women artists
20th-century Native American women
20th-century Native Americans
21st-century Native American women
21st-century Native Americans
Framingham State University alumni